= Kaualena =

Town of ancient Phrygia

Coordinates: 38°35′46″N 29°23′05″E

Kaualena (Ancient Greek: Καυαληνοί) was a town of ancient Phrygia, inhabited in Roman and Byzantine times. Its name does not occur in ancient authors, but is inferred from epigraphic and other evidence.

Its site is near Elmacık in Asiatic Turkey.

The people of Kaualena were called Καβαληνεῖς.
